Galileo's paradox is a demonstration of one of the surprising properties of infinite sets. In his final scientific work, Two New Sciences, Galileo Galilei made apparently contradictory statements about the positive integers. First, a square is an integer which is the square of an integer. Some numbers are squares, while others are not; therefore, all the numbers, including both squares and non-squares, must be more numerous than just the squares.  And yet, for every number there is exactly one square; hence, there cannot be more of one than of the other.  This is an early use, though not the first, of the idea of one-to-one correspondence in the context of infinite sets.

Galileo concluded that the ideas of less, equal, and greater apply to (what we would now call) finite sets, but not to infinite sets.  During the nineteenth century Cantor found a framework in which this restriction is not necessary; it is possible to define comparisons amongst infinite sets in a meaningful way (by which definition the two sets, integers and squares, have "the same size"), and that by this definition some infinite sets are strictly larger than others.

The ideas were not new with Galileo, but his name has come to be associated with them. In particular, Duns Scotus, about 1302, compared even numbers to the whole of numbers.

Galileo on infinite sets

The relevant section of Two New Sciences is excerpted below:

See also
 Dedekind-infinite set
 Hilbert's paradox of the Grand Hotel

References

External links
 Philosophical Method and Galileo's Paradox of Infinity by Matthew W. Parker – PhilSci-Archive

Paradoxes of set theory
Paradoxes of infinity
Paradox